Zamin Uthukuli is a panchayat town in Coimbatore in the Indian state of Tamil Nadu.

Demographics
As of the 2001 census, Zamin Uthukuli had a population of 14,871. Males constitute 94% of the population, and females constitute 6%. Zamin Uthukuli has an average literacy rate of 68%, higher than the national average of 59.5%. In Zamin Uthukuli, 11% of the population is under 6 years of age.

References

Cities and towns in Coimbatore district